Vadim Pirogan (28 June 1921 in Bălţi – 16 January 2007 in Chişinău) was a Bessarabian activist and author. He was the head of the Communist Regime Victims Association and a member of the Moldovan Writers' Union.

Biography 
Vadim Pirogan was born on 28 June 1921 in Bălţi. His father Ştefan Pirogan was mayor of Bălţi (1923–1934). He attended high school in Bălţi, where Eugen Coşeriu, Sergiu Grossu, Valeriu Gafencu, Ovidiu Creangă, Valentin Mândâcanu were his classmates Vadim Pirogan was arrested on 25 June 1941 and for five years, he was imprisoned at Tayshet forced labour camp.

Vadim Pirogan married to Veronica in 1952. He graduated from Lviv Polytechnic. He used to live in Lviv, but in 1989 he moved in Chişinău. Vadim Pirogan founded the Muzeul Memoriei Neamului in 2002. He was the president of the Communist Regime Victims Association beginning in 1999.

Works 
Vadim Pirogan, Cu gandul la tine,  Basarabia mea
Vadim Pirogan, Pe drumurile pribegiei
Vadim Pirogan, Timpuri si oameni
Vadim Pirogan and Boris Movila, Destine romanesti
Vadim Pirogan, Calvarul

See also 
 Muzeul Memoriei Neamului

External links 
 Muzeul Memoriei Neamului website

Notes

1921 births
Romanian people of Moldovan descent
2007 deaths
Moldovan writers
Moldovan male writers
People from Bălți
Lviv Polytechnic alumni
Soviet writers